Isaias Matiaba (born 18 December 1983 in Ioannina, Greece) is a Greek singer and songwriter.

Early life
Isaias Matiaba was born in Ioannina, Greece on 18 December 1983 to a Congolese father and a Greek mother. From an early age, he began studying classical piano and took classical singing lessons.

Discography

Studio albums
(2003) – Words are not forgotten
(2005) – I look at the world
(2008) – I hate you
(2009) – We expect
(2011) – I want (what you want)
(2012) – Dreaming – Full Pack

External links
 Official website

References

1983 births
21st-century Greek male singers
Greek people of Democratic Republic of the Congo descent
Universal Music Greece artists
Living people